Entre Copas y Botellas is a studio album released in 2006 by Regional Mexican artist Lupillo Rivera. Entre Copas y Botellas garnered Rivera a Grammy nomination for Best Banda Album at the 50th Annual Grammy Awards.

Track listing
 Barrio Probre
 Prefiero La Calle
 La Interesada
 El Galletero
 Enseñame a Olvidar
 Entre Copas y Botellas
 La Diferencia
 Indita Mia
 Clave Privada
 La Ruleta
 Gerardo González

Chart performance

Sales and certifications

References

2006 albums
Lupillo Rivera albums
Universal Music Latino albums
Spanish-language albums